Anthony Henry (born 9 January 1967) is an Antigua and Barbuda sprinter. He competed in the men's 100 metres at the 1984 Summer Olympics.

References

1967 births
Living people
Athletes (track and field) at the 1984 Summer Olympics
Antigua and Barbuda male sprinters
Olympic athletes of Antigua and Barbuda
Place of birth missing (living people)